The Asia/Oceania Zone is one of the three zones of regional Davis Cup competition in 2011.

In the Asia/Oceania Zone there are four different groups in which teams compete against each other to advance to the next group.

Participating teams

Seeds

Remaining Nations

Draw

 relegated to Group II in 2012.
 and  advance to World Group Play-off.

First round

China vs. Chinese Taipei

Philippines vs. Japan

Uzbekistan vs. New Zealand

Second round

China vs. Australia

Japan vs. Uzbekistan

First Playoff Round

Second Playoff Round

Chinese Taipei vs. Philippines

References

External links
 Davis Cup draw details

Asia Oceania Zone Group I
Davis Cup Asia/Oceania Zone